Eyjólfsson is a surname. Notable people with the surname include:

Egill Eyjólfsson (1295–1341), Icelandic Roman Catholic bishop
Hólmar Örn Eyjólfsson (born 1990), Icelandic football player
Sigurður Ragnar Eyjólfsson (born 1973), Icelandic football player

Icelandic-language surnames